Matt Kean may refer to:

Matt Kean, Australian politician (born 1981)
Matt Kean, English bassist in the band Bring Me the Horizon